The 40th G7 summit was held 4–5 June, 2014 in Brussels, Belgium. It was originally scheduled to be held as the “40th G8 summit” and be hosted by Russia in the Black Sea resort of Sochi. However, the other seven countries decided on 24 March that the summit would be instead held without Russia in Brussels.

Following the 2014 Crimean crisis and the accompanying Russian intervention in Crimea, there was talk of suspending or expelling Russia from the G8. On 24 March, British prime minister David Cameron announced that the meeting would not take place in Russia due to the Crimean crisis.

The G8 is an unofficial forum which brings together the heads of major world powers: Germany, France, the United Kingdom, Italy, Japan, the United States, and Canada (all since 1976) the EU Commission (since 1981) and Russia (from 1997 until March 2014).  When the  seven founding countries decided to hold the 40th such meeting without Russia, it became the “40th G7 summit”.

Leaders at the summit

The attendees included the leaders of the seven G7 member states, as well as representatives of the European Union. The President of the European Commission is a permanently welcome participant in all meetings and decision-making since 1981.

The 40th G7 summit was the first summit for Italian Prime Minister Matteo Renzi.

Participants

Cancelled Sochi summit 

Traditionally, the host country of the G8 summit sets the agenda. Presidential Executive Office Chief of Staff Sergei Ivanov was the chairman of the organizational committee on preparation for Russia's G8 presidency.  The leaders were expected to focus on responses to new global threats during the next G8 summit. The infrastructure of the 2014 Winter Olympics at Sochi was planned to be used to host the G8 summit. No additional pre-summit costs were budgeted.

Following the Crimean events in March 2014, Italy, Japan, Germany, Canada, France, the United Kingdom and the United States as well as the President of the European Council and President of the European Commission held an extraordinary G7 summit in The Hague and suspended their participation in preparatory meetings for the G8. In a statement, the leaders of the G7 countries stated that Russia's occupation of the Crimea was against the principles of the G7 and contravened the United Nations Charter and its 1997 basing agreement with Ukraine.

Gallery

See also 
 List of G7 summits
 List of G20 summits

References

External links
 
 University of Toronto: G8 Information Centre

2014
2014 conferences
2014 in international relations
Diplomatic conferences in Belgium
21st-century diplomatic conferences (Global)
Events affected by annexation of Crimea by the Russian Federation
2014 in Brussels
Articles containing video clips
June 2014 events in Europe